Beur is a colloquial French term for European-born people whose parents or grandparents are immigrants from North Africa.

Beur or Beurs may also refer to:

Beur Central Jail, the main prison of Bihar, India 
Beur FM, a French local radio station
Beur TV, a French television station
Beurs metro station, in Rotterdam, the Netherlands
Beurs-World Trade Center, a commercial building in Rotterdam, the Netherlands
Wilhelmus Beurs (1656–1700), a Dutch Golden Age painter

See also

Buer (disambiguation)
Beurgeois, a French portmanteau neologism, meaning successful beurs
Butter (French: beurre)